Elizabeth Wood may refer to:
 Elizabeth Boleyn, Lady Boleyn (fl. 1530s), née Elizabeth Wood, one of the chief witnesses against her niece, Anne Boleyn
 Elizabeth Wood (housing director) (1899–1993), Chicago Housing Authority Executive Director
 Elizabeth Wyn Wood (1903–1966), Canadian sculptor
 Elizabeth A. Wood (1912–2006), American crystallographer
 Beth Wood (born 1954), North Carolina public official and accountant
 Elizabeth Wood (director), American film director

See also
 Elisabeth Jean Wood, American political scientist